Kongupatti (Village ID 636305) is a semi-developed village in Omalur taluk, itself within the Salem district of Tamil Nadu, India. According to the 2011 census it has a population of 10400 living in 2657 households.

Transport
The nearest railway is at Chinna Tirupathy and a developed railway station is Salem Junction. The nearest roadway is the national highway which is connected from Omalur.

Temples
Temples in the village are the Periya MariAmman temple and a lord Vishnu temple called Rettagambal temple. There is also a temple called Chinna Tripathi which is near the village.

There is a temple on the top of a hill known as Rasi Karadu, where the people use to go and worship the god during Mariyamman festival.
There is also a Perumal temple on top of a hill.

Festivals

The main festivals are Mariyamman festival which is celebrated during early April.

References

Villages in Salem district